"Futurology" as a term was coined in the twentieth century. What counts under that term has changed over time, as such this list is a jumble, and is intended to be suggestive, not definitive.
Notable futurologists include:

See also 
 Futures studies
 Outline of futures studies
 World Future Society

References

Futurologists